Pamela J. Russell  was an Australian academic researcher of immunology, bladder and prostate research. Russell was awarded Membership of the Order of Australia (AM) for her research on prostate and bladder cancer in 2003.

Biography 

Russell was Emeritus Professor at the Institute of Health and Biomedical Innovation, Queensland University of Technology, based at the Translational Research Institute (Australia) and adjunct professor, Centre for Advanced Imaging, University of Queensland.

Education and training 
Russell trained in immunology at Walter & Eliza Hall Institute, where she obtained an MSc with Sir Macfarlane Burnet. Subsequently, Prof. Russell completed a PhD with Sir Gustav Nossal, on studies of autoimmune diseases.

Russell's postdoctoral training was at the John Curtin School of Medical Research, Canberra, and then she moved to Sydney to take up a postdoctoral position at The Kolling Institute of Medical Research.

Russell joined the APCRC – Q in 2009.

Research 
Russell's early work in Immunology on Systemic Lupus Erythematosus (SLE) showed that the immunosuppressive drug, cyclophosphamide, could be successfully used to treat animals with this disease, leading to its use in patients with SLE. Early work WEHI showed that T cells could kill cancer cells. Further studies of autoimmunity were performed by Russell's group at the Kolling Institute specifically SLE. but also some related work in rheumatoid arthritis and in ankylosing spondylitis and its association with HLA-B27.

Russell's focus of the work at the Kolling Institute was on autoimmunity, specifically Systemic Lupus Erythematosus (SLE), but also some related work in rheumatoid arthritis and in ankylosing spondylitis and its association with HLAB27.

In 1984, Prof. Russell changed her research focus to cancer and, with Dr. Derek Raghavan, established the Urological Cancer Research Centre at Royal Prince Alfred Hospital/University of Sydney. Prof. Russell then directed the Oncology Research Centre (ORC), Prince of Wales Hospital from 1992 to 2010, as conjoint Professor of Medicine, University of New South Wales (UNSW).

Russell then moved to the Translational Research Institute and the Australian Prostate Cancer Research Centre in Queensland in 2012.

Awards 

 2015	Women in Technology Life Sciences Outstanding Achievement Award
 2015	Fellow of the Australian Academy of Health and Medical Sciences
 2015	University of Canberra Alumni Excellence Award Health Winner
 2010	Inaugural Prostate Cancer Foundation of Australia Prize and Lecture for Outstanding Excellence
 2010	Prostate Cancer Foundation of Australia's Researcher of the year
 2009	Life Member, Australasian Gene Therapy Society
 2009	Alban Gee Prize for best poster presentation at USANZ
 2007	Member of the year, listed in Madison's Who's Who
 2006	Honorary Life Member, Prostate Cancer Foundation of Australia
 2006	Awarded prize for outstanding alumni of Kolling Institute of Medical Research (75th Jubilee)
 2005	Listed in Marquis Who's Who in Medicine and Healthcare, USA
 2003-2005	Listed in Who's Who, Australia
 2003	Platinum Nomination for the CSIRO Chairman's medal.  Gene Therapy: A new approach for treating prostate cancer
 2003	AM for outstanding contributions to prostate and bladder cancer research
 1962	Dunlop Rubber prize for Biochemistry
 1960	Commonwealth Scholarship

References

External links 
Australian Prostate Centre
Prostate Cancer Collaborative Research Alliance

20th-century births
2022 deaths
Australian immunologists
Australian women scientists
Year of birth missing
Members of the Order of Australia
Fellows of the Australian Academy of Health and Medical Sciences